Emilio Simonsen (born 31 October 1999) is a Danish professional footballer who plays as a midfielder for Danish 1st Division club Nykøbing.

Club career

Lyngby
Simonsen arrived in the Lyngby Boldklub youth academy as a 12-year-old in 2012. He extended his contract with the club on 24 March 2018, keeping him a part of De Kongeblå until 2021. As part of the contract extension, he was promoted to the first team.
At the age of 17, Simonsen made his first team debut for Lyngby in the Danish Superliga on 3 March against Hobro IK. He made 10 league appearances during the 2017–18 season.

Loan to Nykøbing
On 21 January 2020, Simonsen joined Danish second tier club Nykøbing FC on a year-long loan.

HB Køge
On 26 January 2021 it was confirmed, that Simonsen had signed a three-year deal with Danish 1st Division club HB Køge.

International career
In August 2016, Simonsen received a call-up for the Denmark under-18 team without making an appearance.

References

Danish men's footballers
1999 births
Living people
Denmark youth international footballers
Lyngby Boldklub players
Nykøbing FC players
HB Køge players
Danish Superliga players
Danish 1st Division players
Danish 2nd Division players
Association football wingers